The Mathäser is a location in Munich, west of the Karlsplatz.  It had a variety of buildings and uses over the centuries but was especially known for its beer. It gained wider attraction following the German Revolution of 1918, serving as the headquarters for revolutionaries during the Bavarian Soviet Republic. It now houses a large cinema, called the Mathäser Filmpalast.

References

Cinemas in Germany
Breweries in Germany
Defunct brewery companies of Munich